Grocon is an Australian privately owned development, construction and funds management company. Founded in Melbourne in 1948, it expanded to operate in India and the Middle East. In November 2020, parts of the company were placed in voluntary administration.

History
Grocon grew from a small family concreting business established in Victoria, by Luigi Grollo after he emigrated from Treviso, Italy in 1928. A one-man operation, Luigi Grollo set up his own business in 1948 and completed small concreting projects, such as paving, shopping centre car parks, sewerage infrastructure and swimming pools. His sons Rino and Bruno joined the business at the age of 15. The business expanded rapidly in the 1950s by continuing with concreting of municipal swimming pools and petrol stations in Melbourne. In the years following, the Grollo Group would transition from the building of local community assets throughout the 1960s to constructing landmark developments.

In the 1970s, Grocon moved into concrete construction, such as shopping centres and high-rise buildings and started developing the projects themselves. It was also during the 1970s that Luigi Grollo handed the company over to his two sons and the business continued to rapidly expand. In 1975, Grocon moved to Darwin for 18 months after winning a large contract for rebuilding after Cyclone Tracy. This contract involved the construction of 400 houses for the government. Following this, the Grollo Group went on to develop buildings and operate businesses in a wide cross-section of industries, including commercial, residential, industrial, education, retail, sporting and tourism.

In the 1980s, many developments owned by the Grollo family were sold. 
This included the selling of such assets as The Hyatt, Shell Corner, 200 Queen Street and a suite of shopping centres. At this stage, the Grollo family only retained one major development – the Rialto Towers.

In 2000, the construction business was split between a construction-centric business owned by Bruno and Daniel Grollo and a property development operation owned by Rino Grollo. As part of this shift, Rino Grollo secured Equiset and the Grollo Group (including its family properties). In 1999, Bruno's oldest son, Daniel, assumed control of Grocon as chief executive officer. Daniel Grollo was appointed chairman of the Green Building Council of Australia and the Prime Minister's Business Advisory Council.

In March 2012 the construction business was split again into a construction business, owned by Daniel Grollo, which is the current Grocon, and a property development business owned by his older siblings, Adam and Leeanna.

In December 2013, Grocon launched a five-year, A$10 billion joint venture, called UBS Grocon Real Estate, with Swiss investment bank, UBS. The joint venture created UBS Grocon Real Estate, a full-service real estate and asset management platform that had first right of refusal for Grocon's A$2 billion development pipeline. The venture was chaired by John A. Fraser, chairman and CEO Global Asset Management at UBS and Daniel Grollo acted as a non-executive director.

In 2014, Grocon was named as the preferred developer for the 2018 Commonwealth Games Athletes Village on the Queensland Gold Coast. On 24 February 2014, deputy chief executive officer Carolyn Viney succeeded Daniel Grollo as chief executive officer of Grocon. Daniel Grollo assumed the role of executive chairman whilst retaining full oversight and ownership of the business. In November 2020, parts of Grocon were placed in administration. Cost blowouts for the athletes village for the Games topped $1 billion led to Grocon from having permission refused from the state government to start a project in Queensland.

Awards and accolades
As a company, Grocon was the recipient of numerous awards. In 2010, Grocon was named the Forest Stewardship Council Developer of the Year, and was also the National Master Builders Association Builder of the Year in 2011. Grocon received two The National Association of Women in Construction awards in 2013 for both outstanding and young achievement. In 2011, the company was the recipient of the ANZ–BRW Excellence in Community Practices prize. Grocon won the 2008 Safe Work Australia Best workplace health and safety management system award and received the WorkSafe Victoria OHS Management System of the Year prize.

Industrial disputes
Grocon was involved in conflict with the Construction, Forestry, Mining and Energy Union (CFMEU) from 2002 over the CFMEU's rights at Grocon developments including occupational health and safety management, union access, and the wearing of union badges. This conflict culminated in the CFMEU's picketing of at least one entrance to the Emporium development which resulted in an impassable physical barrier, preventing access to the site through that entrance for Grocon workers. Grocon subsequently launched an A$10.5 million compensation claim in the Supreme Court of Victoria for the blockade. It also sought contempt orders against the union for allegedly breaching two Supreme Court injunctions that ordered an end to the blockade. Justice Cavanough held that free access to the site for Grocon workers was prevented by the CFMEU as access could only be obtained through 'elaborate' police assistance. The Fair Work Building and Construction, the relevant regulatory body, subsequently also launched legal proceedings against the CFMEU. In June 2015, judgment was made against the CFMEU and they were ordered to pay Grocon A$3.5 million in damages.

Swanston Street wall incident
The wall's safety, the role of the billboards Grocon had attached to the structure, and the self-supporting nature of the structure designed by the previous owner were initially identified as possible causes. There was early speculation as to the role of the advertising hoarding and whether a permit had been granted or whether a permit was needed. There were also questions surrounding the role of tree roots in destabilising the wall. An unidentified spokesperson for the Victorian Government asked unions not to block productivity over the case. WorkSafe Victoria filed criminal charges against Grocon and Aussie Signs who were employed by Grocon to construct the billboard. Police acting in the case have stated that Grocon representatives refused to give evidence, and the company did not release an engineering report the court has asked for access to, saying it "was not relevant".

In November 2014 Grocon was fined $250,000 in the Magistrates Court after it pleaded guilty to a single workplace safety charge "... relating to the risk posed by the wall, rather than causing it to fall down."

Alleged sabotage
Grocon experienced two fires on separate Victorian construction sites, and various other acts of suspected sabotage in June 2014.

List of developments
, Grocon built four of Australia's five tallest buildings in Melbourne, Sydney, and South-east Queensland. Grocon subsequently increased it operations abroad in India and the United Arab Emirates.

References

External links
 
 Grollo Group website; the company owned by Rino Grollo, his wife Diana, and their children.

Companies based in Melbourne
Construction and civil engineering companies established in 1948
Construction and civil engineering companies of Australia
1948 establishments in Australia